Ji Eun-hee (born 13 May 1986 in Gapyeong, South Korea), also known as Eun-Hee Ji, is a South Korean professional golfer who plays on the U.S.-based LPGA Tour. She is also a member of the South Korean KLPGA.

LPGA career
Ji joined the LPGA Tour in 2007 and recorded two top-10 finishes in just four events played, including runner-up at the Hana Bank-KOLON Championship. She made her first appearance in a major championship at the 2007 Women's British Open and finished in 5th place.

In 2008, Ji claimed her first LPGA win at the Wegmans LPGA, with a come-from-behind, two-stroke victory over Norwegian star Suzann Pettersen.

In 2009, she made a  birdie on the 72nd hole of the U.S. Women's Open to win by one stroke. As with the 2008 Wegmans, this was a come-from-behind victory. Trailing Cristie Kerr, Ji overcame a double bogey on the 10th and birdied the 13th, 14th and 18th holes.

In 2012, Ji finished tied for second in the LPGA Championship. She had been leading the tournament going into the final round.

Controversy
After Ji won the 2008 Wegmans LPGA, she gave her acceptance speech with the help of a translator. Some say this sparked the proposed "English only" requirement by the LPGA. Ji later commented that she felt the proposed requirement may have targeted her and that in the future she would "pay more attention to improving my English." Over a year later after winning the U.S. Women's Open, she again used a translator for her acceptance speech.

Professional wins (10)

LPGA Tour (6)

KLPGA Tour (2)
2007 (2) Phoenix Park Classic, KB Star Tour

Ladies Asian Golf Tour (2)
2006 (2) Macao Open, Malaysia Open

Major championships

Wins (1)

Results timeline
Results not in chronological order before 2019 or in 2020.

CUT = missed the half-way cut
DQ = disqualified
NT = no tournament
"T" = tied

Summary

Most consecutive cuts made – 12 (2012 British Open – 2015 ANA)
Longest streak of top-10s – 1 (eight times)

Team appearances
Professional
Lexus Cup (representing Asia team): 2008
World Cup (representing South Korea): 2008

References

External links

Eun-Hee Ji at the Seoul Sisters site

South Korean female golfers
LPGA Tour golfers
LPGA of Korea Tour golfers
Winners of LPGA major golf championships
Chung-Ang University alumni
Sportspeople from Gyeonggi Province
People from Gapyeong County
1986 births
Living people
20th-century South Korean women
21st-century South Korean women